Saravan County is   in Sistan and Baluchestan province, Iran. The capital of the county is the city of Saravan. At the 2006 census, the county's population was 239,950 in 47,753 households. The following census in 2011 counted 175,728 people in 39,415 households, by which time Hiduj District and Sib and Suran District had been separated from the county to form Sib and Suran County, and Zaboli District had separated to participate in the formation of Mehrestan County. At the 2016 census the county's population was 191,661, in 50,524 households. Jaleq District was separated from the county on 17 January 2019 to form Golshan County.

Administrative divisions

The population history and structural changes of Saravan County's administrative divisions over three consecutive censuses are shown in the following table. The latest census shows three districts, eight rural districts, and five cities.

References

 

Counties of Sistan and Baluchestan Province